Lincoln Clement Roshan Abeysinghe (: born 10 February 1963) is a Sri Lankan businessperson and international cricket commentator. He is also working as a marketing professional in a skincare company.

Biography 
Roshan Abeysinghe was born on 10 February 1963, in Colombo. He was educated and played school cricket at the St. Joseph's College. He is one of the fewest school boys to have played for St. Joseph's College in the Big match contests against St. Peter's College.

Career as a commentator 
Presently, Roshan has been regarded as one of the very few international cricket commentators from Sri Lanka along with Russel Arnold and Ranjit Fernando. He is working as an international cricket commentator in Test Match Special, a British radio programme covering about England related cricket matches and for the Ten Sports Network (now known as Sony Ten Network) from 2010 mainly related to Sri Lankan cricket matches. In 2016, he was named the Wisden Cricket Personality of the Month for his commentary services. Roshan Abeysinghe is a professional marketing personality apart from being a cricket commentator.

References

External links 
 

1963 births
Living people
Sri Lankan cricketers
Sri Lankan cricket commentators
Sinhalese businesspeople
Ragama Cricket Club cricketers
Sri Lankan Roman Catholics
Sportspeople from Colombo